Maxwell George Schneider (born June 21, 1992), also known by his mononym MAX, is an American singer-songwriter, actor and model who is currently signed to Arista and Sony RED. In 2018, MAX's single "Lights Down Low" went double platinum in the US, Platinum in Canada, and Gold in Australia. This led to MAX being named an iHeart 2019 'Best New Pop Artist' nominee, and, in 2020, his single "Love Me Less" went Gold in the US  and Canada.

Career
Schneider was raised in Woodstock, New York. He began performing at age three and acquired his first agent at the age of 14. Schneider was a swing understudy in the Broadway musical 13 covering 4 roles in 2008 and 2009, and modeled with Madonna for an international Dolce & Gabbana campaign. He was the 2010 YoungArts Theater Winner, and released his debut extended play (EP) First Encounters that year.

In 2012, Schneider co-wrote the song "Show You How to Do" with Ben Charles for the Disney series Shake It Up (2010). He portrayed Zander in the Nickelodeon TV series How to Rock and also co-wrote a song for the show, "Last 1 Standing" with Matt Wong and Claire Demorest, which he sold to the show—the song featured in two episodes of the series. Schneider also starred in the Nickelodeon original film Rags, in the lead role  as Charlie Prince. Later that year, he toured with Victoria Justice on her Make It In America Tour,  and co-wrote the song "Standing in China" for Cody Simpson's debut studio album Paradise.

Schneider featured on two tracks from Hoodie Allen's debut album People Keep Talking in October 2014. In February 2015, he released an album titled NWL. Originally planned to be an EP titled The Nothing Without Love EP, the album was funded by donations through Kickstarter. Its first single, "Nothing Without Love", was originally released together with an accompanying music video on May 21, 2013. The singer's 2014 single "Mug Shot", also included on the album, was his first to be released under the stagename MAX. Schneider has since gone by MAX musically because he "[wants the name] to be more of a vehicle for the music".

On February 19, 2015, it was announced that MAX had signed with DCD2 Records and would be releasing new music under the label. Throughout June, he toured with Fall Out Boy, Wiz Khalifa, and Allen on the Boys of Zummer Tour. The album Hell's Kitchen Angel, his first under DCD2, followed in April 2016. It featured the singles "Lights Down Low" and a "Young Pop-God" by GQ—the former later earned double platinum certifications in the United States and Canada. MAX became the lead singer of a new soul group called Witchita, formed with Tim Armstrong, that same month. The group's first single, "Mrs Magoo", was released via Hellcat Records on April 21. In June, he was picked as Elvis Duran's Artist of the Month and appeared on NBC's Today show, hosted by Kathie Lee Gifford and Hoda Kotb, where he performed the single "Gibberish".

MAX released the collaboration single "Team" with Noah Cyrus in 2018. During the summer of 2019, MAX's new single "Love Me Less", featuring Quinn XCII, reached the top 20 at Top 40 Radio. MAX was named an iHeart 2019 Best New Pop Artist nominee, and labeled by Billboard as a number one Emerging Artist. Since then, Love Me Less has been certified Gold in the US and Canada. MAX performed the single on Jimmy Kimmel Live!, the Today Show, and Live with Kelly and Ryan. In 2020, he released "Missed Calls" with Hayley Kiyoko, and featured on the mixtape D-2 by Korean artist Agust D, the solo moniker of Suga from the South Korean group BTS. Suga later featured in MAX's song "Blueberry Eyes". MAX's third studio album, Colour Vision, was released on September 18.

Personal life
Schneider grew up in Woodstock, New York. He was raised Jewish. His father is from a Jewish family and his mother converted to Judaism. Max married Emily Cannon at a courthouse on April 1, 2016, and welcomed their child, a daughter named Edie Celine, in December 2020.

Discography

NWL (2015)
Hell's Kitchen Angel (2016)
Colour Vision (2020)

Filmography

Awards and nominations

References

External links
 Max Schneider Website
 

1992 births
Living people
21st-century American male actors
21st-century American singers
21st-century American male singers
American child models
American child singers
American male child actors
American male dancers
American male film actors
American male models
American male singer-songwriters
American male stage actors
American male television actors
American tenors
Dancers from New York (state)
Jewish American male actors
Jewish male models
Jewish singers
Male actors from New York City
Male models from New York (state)
People from Manhattan
People from Woodstock, New York
Singers from New York City
VJs (media personalities)
21st-century American Jews
Singer-songwriters from New York (state)